"Tulips" is a single by British band Bloc Party. The song was released as a single in the United States on CD and 7" vinyl.

The video included with the song features a few clips of Bloc Party live shows.

In other media

"Tulips" was featured in "Mars vs. Mars", an episode of the television series Veronica Mars.

Track listing
CD single DM076
 "Tulips"
 "Tulips" (Minotaur Shock Mix)

7" vinyl DM076 
 "Tulips"
 "Tulips" (Minotaur Shock Mix)

Charts

References

2005 singles
Bloc Party songs
2004 songs
Songs written by Kele Okereke
Songs written by Gordon Moakes
Songs written by Russell Lissack
Songs written by Matt Tong